Carl "Karel" Kratz (10 November 1893 – 30 August 1962) was a Dutch male water polo player. He was a member of the Netherlands men's national water polo team. He competed with the team at the 1920 Summer Olympics.

References

External links
 

1893 births
1962 deaths
Dutch male water polo players
Water polo players at the 1920 Summer Olympics
Olympic water polo players of the Netherlands
Sportspeople from Rotterdam
20th-century Dutch people